Geneviève McKenzie-Sioui, sometimes performing under the name Shanipiap, is an Innu musician, writer, television creator, and activist in Quebec.  Born in Matimekosh in 1956, she later relocated to Wendake. She is a singer-songwriter in the Innu language, and an author in both Innu and in French, has been the producer/director/presenter of her own children's television program on Aboriginal Peoples Television Network and TFO, and has recently been active in the Idle No More movement.

References

1956 births
Canadian singer-songwriters
Innu people
Singers from Quebec
Canadian drummers
First Nations musicians
People from Côte-Nord
Living people
21st-century Canadian women writers
Canadian writers in French
Indigenous Canadian women
Idle No More